The men's épée was one of eight fencing events on the fencing at the 1980 Summer Olympics programme. It was the eighteenth appearance of the event. The competition was held from 27 to 28 July 1980. 42 fencers from 16 nations competed. Each nation was limited to 3 fencers. The event was won by Johan Harmenberg of Sweden, the nation's first victory in the event and first medal of any color in the men's individual épée since 1924. Silver went to Ernő Kolczonay of Hungary, extending the nation's podium streak to four Games despite the retirement of three-time medalist Győző Kulcsár. Philippe Riboud of France took bronze. Sweden's Rolf Edling, a two-time World Champion, made his third final in the event, but once again missed the podium.

Background

This was the 18th appearance of the event, which was not held at the first Games in 1896 (with only foil and sabre events held) but has been held at every Summer Olympics since 1900.

With West Germany boycotting the Games and Győző Kulcsár retiring, none of the 1976 medalists returned. Two of the other three finalists did, however: fourth-place finisher István Osztrics of Hungary and sixth-place finisher (as well as 1972 finalist) Rolf Edling of Sweden. Philippe Riboud of France was the reigning (1979) World Champion; Sweden's Johan Harmenberg had won in 1977 and Edling had been World Champion in 1973 and 1974. (The 1975 and 1978 World Champion and 1976 Olympic champion, Alexander Pusch, was from the boycotting West Germany.)

Kuwait made its debut in the event. Belgium, France, Great Britain, and Sweden each appeared for the 16th time, tying the absent United States for most among nations.

Competition format

The 1980 tournament continued to use the mix of pool and knockout rounds used in 1968 and 1976. The competition included two pool rounds, followed by a double-elimination knockout round, finishing with a final pool round. In each pool round, the fencers competed in a round-robin.

Bouts in the round-robin pools were to 5 touches; bouts in the double-elimination round were to 10 touches. No barrages were held.

 Round 1: 8 pools of 5 or 6 fencers each. The top 3 in each pool (24 total) advanced.
 Round 2: 4 pools of 6 fencers each. The top 4 in each pool (16 total) advanced.
 Elimination rounds: A double-elimination tournament. The 4 fencers who won in both of the first two rounds advanced, as did the 2 fencers who reached the end of the repechage.
 Final round: 1 pool of 6 fencers.

Schedule

All times are Moscow Time (UTC+3)

Results

Round 1

Round 1 Pool A

Round 1 Pool B

Round 1 Pool C

Round 1 Pool D

Round 1 Pool E

Round 1 Pool F

Round 1 Pool G

Round 1 Pool H

Round 2

Round 2 Pool A

Round 2 Pool B

Round 2 Pool C

Round 2 Pool D

Double elimination rounds

Winners brackets

Winners group 1

Winners group 2

Winners group 3

Winners group 4

Losers brackets

Losers group 1

Losers group 2

Final round

Final classification

References

Epee men
Men's events at the 1980 Summer Olympics